Louis Ray Cheek, Jr. (born October 6, 1964 in Galveston, Texas) is a former American football offensive lineman in the National Football League for the Miami Dolphins, Dallas Cowboys, Philadelphia Eagles, and the Green Bay Packers.  He played college football at Texas A&M University and was drafted in the eighth round of the 1988 NFL Draft.

1964 births
Living people
People from Galveston, Texas
American football offensive linemen
Texas A&M Aggies football players
Miami Dolphins players
Dallas Cowboys players
Philadelphia Eagles players
Green Bay Packers players